Antonio Calpe Hernández (4 February 1940 – 7 April 2021) was a Spanish professional footballer who played as a defender.

Club career
Born in Valencia, Calpe started playing professionally with local Levante UD, competing from 1963 to 1965 in La Liga. In the summer of 1965 he joined Real Madrid, being part of the squads during their Yé-yé era and winning five major trophies, including three national championships and the 1965–66 edition of the European Cup; he appeared in 12 matches in the latter competition for the team during his stint.

In 1971, 31-year-old Calpe returned to his previous club, spending the vast majority of his second spell in Tercera División. The only exception to this occurred in the 1973–74 season in Segunda División, and he retired from the game in June 1975.

Calpe was one of three managers for Levante in 1981–82, as the second-tier campaign eventually ended in relegation.

Death
Calpe died on 7 April 2021 at the age of 81, after a long illness.

Honours
Real Madrid
La Liga: 1966–67, 1967–68, 1968–69
Copa del Generalísimo: 1969–70
European Cup: 1965–66

Levante
Tercera División: 1972–73

References

External links

1940 births
2021 deaths
Spanish footballers
Footballers from Valencia (city)
Association football defenders
La Liga players
Segunda División players
Tercera División players
CD Alcoyano footballers
Levante UD footballers
Real Madrid CF players
Spain B international footballers
Spanish football managers
Segunda División managers
Levante UD managers